The Sendeturm Dobratsch (Dobratsch Transmitter Tower) is a radio tower on the Dobratsch mountain, the easternmost peak of the Gailtal Alps near Villach in Carinthia, Austria. 

The transmitter was built in 1971 and succeeded a provisional facility on the lower Pyramidenkogel mountain near Klagenfurt. It consists of a concrete tower which carries a guyed steel tube mast on the top, similar to the Gerbrandy Tower in the Netherlands. The transmission facility can be reached by a private cable car from Bad Bleiberg.

The Dobratsch Transmitter Tower is used for directional radio services and FM broadcasting as well as for DVB-T transmission of several TV programmes. 125,000 watts ERP make it the strongest transmitter of Austria. It supplies virtually the entire state of Carinthia as well as adjacent regions in Styria, Italy (Friuli-Venezia Giulia) and Slovenia (Upper Carniola).

See also
List of towers
List of masts

External links
 http://www.skyscraperpage.com/diagrams/?b46989
 
 Pictures of Dobratsch transmitting site

Towers in Austria
Buildings and structures in Carinthia (state)